Dame Maria Amieriye Osunde (1928–2008) was a Nigerian educator who founded Auntie Maria School.

She was honoured by Pope John Paul II with a Benemerenti medal  in 1993, and has also received an award of excellence from the President’s Inter-state Secondary School Debate, Nigeria, Edo state chapter.

Published works
The Teacher My Memoirs, Benin, 2005.

References

1928 births
2008 deaths
Nigerian educators
Recipients of the Benemerenti medal